

References

Wind tunnels